An  is a strange, furry yōkai, or Japanese monster, that is illustrated in Sekien Toriyama's Gazu Hyakki Tsurezure Bukuro.

Mythology
It is a type of tsukumogami formed from a stirrup, usually one that once belonged to a dead soldier. It is said that the abumi-guchi will wait where it lies for the dead soldier to return.

External links
 

Tsukumogami